Nathália Cataldo Rodrigues (born December 9, 1980 in Bariri, Brazil) is a Brazilian actress.

Biography 

Natallia is the daughter of a former priest, now market consultant and a marketing director. She graduated from the School of Dramatic Art at the University of São Paulo.

She debuted on TV as a child, as an assistant stage game show Show Maravilha in SBT. Modeling career began at the age of ten and fifteen she started to study theater. She moved to Rio de Janeiro at twenty-one years and landed a role in the soap opera Desejos de Mulher, Rede Globo. Her character, Paty, was the daughter of the characters of José Wilker and Renata Sorrah.

In 2007, Natallia joined the cast of the show Alta Estação as the character Taíssa. In the same year, she played Laura, a prosecutor of Justice who falls for a young fisherman in the novel Luz do Sol, even on Rede Record. In 2008 lived the character Suelen a suburban Rio fascinated by fame Chamas da Vida.

After five years in Record, Natallia Rodrigues is back at the Globo network. She returns in a cameo in the telenovela Insensato Coração. In 2012 participated in the remake of Gabriela, the plot played the Russian prostitute Natasha.

In August 2012 the cover of the Brazilian edition of Playboy magazine in a special edition with 50 pages commemorating 37 years of revista.<ref>[http://ego.globo.com/famosos/noticia/2012/08/veja-nathalia-rodrigues-na-capa-da-playboy.html Veja Nathália Rodrigues na capa da 'Playboy''']</ref> In 2013 returns with the novels Amor à Vida'', the plot she will interpret the nurse Elenice.

She was married to Tchello, bassist Detonautas Roque Clube.

Career

Television

Film

Theater

References

External links 

1980 births
Living people
Brazilian telenovela actresses
Brazilian film actresses
Brazilian stage actresses
People from Bariri